The Blue Anchor is a pub at 13 Lower Mall, Hammersmith, London, that dates from 1722.

The pub was first licensed on 9 June 1722 to a Mr. John Savery. It was originally called the Blew Anchor and Washhouses, but they gave up washing at some point.

On 7 January 1789, a whole sheep, bought for sixteen shillings, was roasted outside.

In the Victorian era, various partitions were added to the interior, but they have been removed. There is a "rather sombre" collection of artefacts from the First World War.

The pub featured in the Gwyneth Paltrow 1998 movie Sliding Doors, where her character is seen dancing with John Hannah and others after a boat race. The pub also regularly featured in episodes of the British television show New Tricks.

Gustav Holst was a frequent visitor, and composed his Hammersmith Suite there.

The Blue Anchor is owned by the Bermuda-based Property Trust Group.

References

External links

Pubs in the London Borough of Hammersmith and Fulham
Hammersmith